"Half the World" is a song by American singer Belinda Carlisle, released in 1991 as the third single from her fourth studio album, Live Your Life Be Free (1991). The song was written by Richard Feldman, Eric Pressly and Ellen Shipley, and produced by Feldman. It features backing vocals from Sheryl Crow.

Music video
A music video was produced to promote the single.

Critical reception
Upon its release as single, Music & Media described the song as a "lushly orchestrated ballad". David Quantick of NME criticized it as "gourmet toss ordinaire" and "a weedy 'Time After Time' clone ballad". He was more favorable towards the version of "Live Your Life Be Free which appears as a B-side on the single, describing it as "a belting verse which suggests Carlisle could be the punk rock Suzi Quatro of the 21st century". In a retrospective review of Live Your Life Be Free, Justin Kantor of AllMusic noted the song's "elegant arrangement" and "timeless melody", the latter of which he considered "the kind that made earlier hits like "Heaven Is a Place on Earth" and "Circle in the Sand" mainstays on radio long after their chart runs."

Track listings
CD 1
 "Half the World (radio edit)
 "Only a Dream (previously unreleased) (Charlotte Caffey, Belinda Carlisle, and Richard Feldman)
 "Live Your Life Be Free (Original intro version)

CD 2
 "Half the World (album version)
 "Vision of You (Remix 91 version)
 "Circle In the Sand (album version)
 "Love Never Dies (album version)

Charts

References

External links
 Belinda Carlisle 1991 singles at BelindaVault

1990s ballads
1991 singles
1991 songs
Belinda Carlisle songs
Songs written by Ellen Shipley
Songs written by Richard Feldman (songwriter)
Virgin Records singles